James Tiece (died ca. 1423), of New Romney, Kent, was an English politician.

Tiece was a Member of Parliament for New Romney in February 1383, April 1384, January 1390, November 1390 and 1417.

References

14th-century births
1420s deaths
English MPs February 1383
English MPs April 1384
People from New Romney
English MPs January 1390
English MPs 1417